The construction of theaters, opera houses, and other cultural facilities by China as gifts to foreign countries is a part of China's foreign aid program.  In a white paper published by China in 2009 on its aid projects in the area of civil construction, the building of cultural facilities is one of the types identified among a total of 2,025 projects stated as built by a Chinese grant or no-interest loan to the recipient country.

 
A national opera house in Algiers is under construction as a US$40 million gift by China to Algeria.   The foundation stone for the 1400-seat venue was laid in a ceremony in November 2012.  

The Palais des Congrès de Yaoundé was built by China and opened in 1982.  The venue is a 1,500-seat multipurpose performance hall with "an ultra-modern stage boasting the country's best sound and lighting equipment." 
  
The National Theatre in Accra was opened in January 1993 after construction by China.  The theatre is a gift as the loan from China funding the construction would later be cancelled in 2007.  China granted a further US$2 million to refurbish the theatre for Ghana's golden jubilee celebrations.  
The Drama Studio at the University of Ghana at Legon was built under the program as the original work on the National Theatre.
 
The Plaza Theatre in Rose Hill was renovated in 2008 using funds provided by China in the form of a non-interest loan.  
 
The Grand Theatre in Dakar was constructed from 2008 to 2011 by Complant as a gift.   The six-storey, 1800-seat theatre was built at a cost of 16 billion CFA francs, of which China paid 14 billion CFA francs and Senegal contributed the rest.
Construction on a Museum of Black Civilization located in Dakar began in 2011, funded by a grant of $US30 million from China.   The contractor for the project is the Shanghai Construction Group.
 
National Theatre of Somalia was built by China as a gift to Somalia in 1967.  
 
Nelum Pokuna Mahinda Rajapaksa Theatre is theatre in Colombo built in 2011 by China as gift to enhance ties with Sri Lanka.   Construction of the 1288-seat venue was handled by the Yanjian Group.
 
National Academy for the Performing Arts in Port of Spain

References

Chinese foreign aid